My Favorite Waste of Time is singer-songwriter Freedy Johnston's 2007 release.  It consists of cover versions of songs by other artists.

Track listing

"You're My Favorite Waste of Time" by Marshall Crenshaw
"I Want You Bad" by NRBQ (Adams, Crandon)
"Do You Know the Way to San José" (Burt Bacharach, Hal David), made popular by Dionne Warwick
"The Sad Cafe" by the Eagles (Frey, Henley, Souther, Walsh)
"I've Been Waiting" by Matthew Sweet
"Listen to What the Man Said" by Wings (Paul McCartney) 
"Let 'Em In" by Paul McCartney & Wings (Paul McCartney, Linda McCartney)
"Shadow of a Doubt (A Complex Kid)" by Tom Petty and the Heartbreakers (Tom Petty)
"Bus Stop" by the Hollies (Graham Gouldman)
"Night and Day" by Cole Porter

2007 albums
Freedy Johnston albums
Bar/None Records albums